Eumetriochroa hederae is a moth of the family Gracillariidae. It is known from the islands of Honshū, Kyūshū, Shikoku in Japan and in China (Hunan, Jiangxi).

The wingspan is 8.1–9.7 mm.

The larvae feed on Hedera rhombea and Hedera nepalensis var. sinensis. They mine the leaves of their host plant. The mine starts as a small irregular blotch, occurring on the upper side of the leaf. It is purple brown in colour. After hibernation, the larva creates a very long serpentine mine, which is stretched from the blotchy part. Most larvae make a pupal chamber at the end of the mine. The pupal chamber is elliptical, with a swollen under side and wrinkled upper side.

References

Phyllocnistinae
Moths of Japan
Moths described in 1998